McMath is an impact crater on the Moon's  far side. It lies to the south-southwest of the prominent crater Jackson, and material from the ray system centered on Jackson lies across most of McMath. Farther to the south lies the crater pair of Zhukovskiy and Lebedinskiy.

This is a worn, torn up, and eroded crater formation with several small craters along the rim edge. The rim is the most heavily worn at the northern end, but is more intact to the east and west. The interior floor is relatively level, and is marked by only a few tiny craterlets.

McMath lies to the northwest of the Dirichlet-Jackson Basin.

Satellite craters 

By convention these features are identified on lunar maps by placing the letter on the side of the crater midpoint that is closest to McMath.

See also 
 1955 McMath, minor planet

References 

 
 
 
 
 
 
 
 
 
 
 
 

Impact craters on the Moon